Michael Chrolenko (born 19 July 1988) is a Norwegian figure skater. He is the 2006-2007 Norwegian National Champion and the 2003-2005 Norwegian Junior National Champion. He has competed four times at the World Junior Figure Skating Championships and once at the European Figure Skating Championships. He is the 2005 Nordic Championships champion on the junior-level.  

Chrolenko is coached by his father, Marek Chrolenko, who is a former Polish national pairs champion who placed 7th at the European Championships in 1977.

Chrolenko competed at the Swedish national championships for competitive experience.

Programs

Competitive highlights

References

External links

Navigation

Norwegian male single skaters
1988 births
Living people
Sportspeople from Trondheim
Norwegian people of Polish descent